London Steede-Jackson (born 30 December 1994) is a Bermudian footballer who plays for BAA Wanderers as a midfielder.

Career
Steede-Jackson played college soccer for Thomas College. He began his club career with BAA Wanderers in 2018. He made his international debut for Bermuda in 2019.

References

1994 births
Living people
Bermudian footballers
Bermuda international footballers
BAA Wanderers F.C. players
Association football midfielders
Bermudian expatriate footballers
Bermudian expatriates in the United States
Expatriate soccer players in the United States